The following is a list of notable lighting designers:

List
Kevin Adams
Christopher Akerlind
Neil Austin
Peter Barnes (lighting designer)
Brian Sidney Bembridge
Ken Billington
Howell Binkley
Marc Brickman
Andrew Bridge
Filippo Cannata
Paule Constable
Hervé Descottes
Johnny Dodd
Kevin Dreyer
Peggy Eisenhauer
Beverly Emmons
Jules Fisher
Paul Gallo
Paul Gregory
Mark Henderson
David Hersey
Gilbert Vaughn Hemsley, Jr.
Donald Holder
Mark Howett
James F. Ingalls
Shiu-Kay Kan
Natasha Katz
Mikki Kunttu
Chris Kuroda
Luc Lafortune
Brian MacDevitt
Stanley McCandless
Tharon Musser
Billy Name
Sergio Orozco
Chris Parry
Dave Parry
Kenneth Posner
Maurizio Rossi
Tim Routledge
Tapas Sen (1924 - 2006)
George Sexton
Jonathan Smeeton
Sally Storey
Clifton Taylor
Jennifer Tipton
Rogier van der Heide
Hugh Vanstone
Scott Warner
Lee Watson
Robert Wierzel
Cosmo Wilson
Patrick Woodroofe

Pioneers

Adolphe Appia
Imero Fiorentino
Stanley McCandless
Tharon Musser
Jean Rosenthal
Tom Skelton

!
Lighting designers